Lovely Joan is a traditional English folk song/ballad (Roud #592), and the tune to which it is sung. Its melody was used as the counterpoint tune used in British composer Ralph Greaves's arrangement of Fantasia on "Greensleeves" from Ralph Vaughan Williams's opera Sir John in Love.Lyrics
The words to "Lovely Joan," as printed in The Penguin Book of English Folk Songs, are as follows:

A fine young man it was indeed,
He was mounted on his milk-white steed; 
He rode, he rode himself all alone,
Until he came to lovely Joan.

"Good morning to you, pretty maid."
And, "Twice good morning, sir", she said. 
He gave her a wink, she rolled her eye. 
Says he to himself, "I'll be there by and by."

"Oh don't you think those pooks of hay 
A pretty place for us to play? 
So come with me like a sweet young thing 
And I'll give you my golden ring."

Then he pulled off his ring of gold. 
"My pretty little miss, do this behold. 
I'd freely give it for your maidenhead." 
And her cheeks they blushed like the roses red.

"Give me that ring into my hand 
And I will neither stay nor stand, 
For this would do more good to me 
Than twenty maidenheads," said she.

And as he made for the pooks of hay 
She leaped on his horse and tore away. 
He called, he called, but it was all in vain 
Young Joan she never looked back again.

She didn't think herself quite safe,
No, not till she came to her true love's gate.
She's robbed him of his horse and ring,
And left him to rage in the meadows green.Sung by C. Jay, Acle, Norfolk (R.V.W. 1908).Other uses
The melody for Lovely Joan was used by Emerson, Lake & Powell on the track Touch and Go of their eponymous album Emerson Lake & Powell'' in 1986 (uncredited). This traditional English folk song/ballad was integrally covered by Bristol-based teenage folk quartet Folkal Point and released on their self-titled studio album in 1972 through Midas Recordings.

The melody was used for a set of variations commissioned for the 2017 Presteigne Festival from a number of composers, who each wrote one variation. The composers were Thomas Hyde, David Matthews, Adrian Williams, Michael Berkeley, Christopher Gunning, Huw Watkins, Sally Beamish, and Matthew Taylor.

References

External links
Lyrics

English folk songs